Ghedina is an Italian surname that may refer to
Bruno Ghedina (1943–2021), Italian ice hockey player
Giuseppe Ghedina (1898–1986), Italian cross country skier 
Guerrino Ghedina (born 1956), Italian Olympic bobsleigh competitor
Guido Ghedina (born 1931), Italian Olympic alpine skier 
Kristian Ghedina (born 1969), Italian alpine skier 
Luigi Ghedina (mountain climber) (1924–2009), Italian mountain climber
Luigi Ghedina (painter), Italian decorative painter and decorator